Kristine A. DeVert-Juarez (born March 14, 1973) is an American former soccer player who played as a midfielder, making four appearances for the United States women's national team.

Career
In college, DeVert played for the Santa Clara Broncos from 1991 to 1992. She scored nine goals and recorded six assists for the Broncos. From 1993 to 1994, she played for the Pepperdine Waves, where she scored 14 goals and registered 14 assists in 36 appearances, holding the school record for career assists per game. She was included in the All-WCC Second Team in 1994.

DeVert played for the U.S. under-16 and under-20 national teams. She made her international debut for the United States on October 9, 1997 in a friendly match against Germany. In total, she made four appearances for the U.S. and scored one goal, earning her final cap on December 13, 1997 in a friendly match against Brazil.

Personal life
DeVert, a native of Petaluma, California, graduated from Pepperdine University with a degree in kinesiology. DeVert married Carlos Juarez, a former college soccer player who also coached the San Diego Spirit, and has four children.

Career statistics

International

International goals

References

1973 births
Living people
People from Petaluma, California
Soccer players from California
American women's soccer players
United States women's under-20 international soccer players
United States women's international soccer players
Women's association football midfielders
Santa Clara Broncos women's soccer players
Pepperdine Waves women's soccer players